Liocleonus is a genus of cylindrical weevils belonging to the family Curculionidae.

Species 
 Liocleonus amoenus Chevrolat, 1876
 Liocleonus clathratus (Olivier 1807)
 Liocleonus leucomelas Fåhraeus, 1842
 Liocleonus umbrosus Chevrolat, 1873

References 

 Global Names Index

Lixinae